Meteor rock can refer to:

Meteoroid, a small sand to boulder-sized particle of debris in the Solar system
Kryptonite, mineral from the Superman mythos